Bausen is a municipality in the Aran Valley, Catalonia, Spain, close to the French border. The mayor is José Antonio Barés Martín (CDA).

References

External links
 Government data pages 

Municipalities in Val d'Aran